David Rushmere (born 4 March 1999) is a South African cricketer. He made his List A debut on 16 February 2020, for Boland in the 2019–20 CSA Provincial One-Day Challenge.

References

External links
 

1999 births
Living people
South African cricketers
Boland cricketers
Place of birth missing (living people)